Hpon (also spelled Hpun) was a moribund Burmish language spoken by older adults in the gorges of the upper Irrawaddy River of Burma, north of Bhamo. There were two dialects, northern and southern.

References

 Henderson, Eugénie J. A. (1986). "Some hitherto unpublished material on Northern (Megyaw) Hpun." John McCoy and Timothy Light, eds. Contributions to Sino-Tibetan Studies: 101-134.
 Yabu Shirō 藪 司郎 (2003). The Hpun language endangered in Myanmar. Osaka: Osaka University of Foreign Studies.
 Tun Aung Kyaw ထွန်အေင်ကျော် Thwanʺ Oṅ Kyo' (2007). ဖွန်းဒေသိယစကားလေ့လာချက် Phwanʺ desiyacakāʺ leʹlā khyak [A study on the Hpun dialect]. PhD thesis, မြန်မာဌာန ရန်ကုန်တက္ကသိုလ် Burmese Department, Rangoon university. 

Burmish languages